Gradey Dick (born November 20, 2003) is an American basketball player at the University of Kansas. A small forward, he stands  and weighs . In 2022, Dick was named the boy's Gatorade National Player of the Year.

High school career
Dick started high school at Wichita Collegiate School in Wichita, Kansas where he spent two years. In his final year with the school, Dick averaged 20 points a game while reaching the state playoffs. Dick transferred to Sunrise Christian Academy. He played two years for the school averaging 18 points a game in his senior year. Dick was named to the rosters for the McDonald's All-American Game, and Nike Hoop Summit. On March 22, 2022, Dick was named the Gatorade National Player of the Year.

Recruiting
Dick received basketball scholarship offers from Kansas, Iowa State, and Baylor, among others, during his first two years of high school. He emerged as a five-star recruit during his tenure with Sunrise Christian Academy. On March 3, 2021, Dick committed to play college basketball for Kansas over offers from Florida and Illinois.

College career
In his college debut, Dick tallied 23 points, 2 rebounds, 2 steals and 1 assist in a 89–64 victory over Omaha. He was named to the Second Team All-Big 12 as well as the All-Newcomer and All-Freshman teams.

Career statistics

College

|-
| style="text-align:left;"| 2022–23
| style="text-align:left;"| Kansas
| 18|| 18 || 31.9 || .457 || .453 || .804 || 5.3 || 1.8 || 1.7 || .2 || 14.7
|- class="sortbottom"
| style="text-align:center;" colspan="2"| Career
|| 18 || 18 || 31.9 || .457 || .453 || .804 || 5.3 || 1.8 || 1.7 || .2 || 14.7

National team career
Dick represented the United States at the 2021 FIBA 3x3 Under-18 World Cup in Debrecen. He averaged 3.2 points, helping his team win the gold medal.

Personal life
Dick is a Christian. He has said, “I was given, fortunately, all these blessings in my life, and that’s kind of my hand, and I’m trying to do the best I can do with it and glorify God while I’m doing it.”

References

External links
Kansas Jayhawks bio
USA Basketball Bio
FIBA Basketball Profile
ESPN Profile

2003 births
Living people
American men's 3x3 basketball players
American men's basketball players
Basketball players from Wichita, Kansas
Kansas Jayhawks men's basketball players
McDonald's High School All-Americans
Small forwards